Sam Saturday is a British television police procedural series, broadcast between 27 June and 8 August 1992. The six-part series produced by Cinema Verity in association with LWT, broadcast on ITV, follows the work of DI Sam Sterne (Ivan Kaye), a Jewish police detective, as he struggles to balance the demands of the job with his private life. The series was created by writer and director Alvin Rakoff, and was produced by the production company of executive producer Verity Lambert. The series was just one of a number of commissions made by LWT controller of drama Nick Elliott in 1991, following the announcement that both The Ruth Rendell Mysteries and Inspector Morse were to cease production.

The first episode of the series finds Sterne moving back in with his mother, Rita (Doreen Mantle), after a messy divorce. Three episodes of the series were written by acclaimed writer Stanley Price. Despite good reception, in the light of both Inspector Morse and The Ruth Rendell Mysteries returning to the ITV schedules, a second series was never commissioned. In 2013, Kaye stated in an interview that he was grateful to have "his own series at 30", and explained how the series allowed him to break through into other television roles, as well as securing a leading West End role within six months of the programme's broadcast.

Cast
 Ivan Kaye as DI Sam Sterne
 Peter Armitage as Jim Butler 
 Doreen Mantle as Rita Sterne
 Dennis Victory as Mike 
 Michael Elwyn as CDI Simpson 
 David Fleeshman as Michael Sterne 
 Simon Slater as DI Griffiths 
 Lauren Jacobs as Miriam Sterne 
 Paul Opacic as DC Knights
 Helen Levien as WPC Daniels

Episodes

References

External links

1992 British television series debuts
1992 British television series endings
1990s British police procedural television series
1990s British television miniseries
Television series by ITV Studios
London Weekend Television shows
English-language television shows
Television shows set in London
Jews and Judaism in fiction